Dorsa Argand is a wrinkle ridge system at  on the Moon, in Oceanus Procellarum near the border with Mare Imbrium. It is approximately 92 km long and was named after Swiss geologist Émile Argand in 1976.  The name of the feature was approved by the IAU in 1976.

References

External links

Dorsa Argand at The Moon Wiki

Ridges on the Moon
Mare Imbrium